Mila Parély (7 October 1917 – 14 January 2012), born Olga Colette Peszynski, was a French actress of Polish ancestry best known for the roles of Félicie, Belle's eldest sister, in Jean Cocteau's La Belle et la Bête (1946), and as Geneviève in La Règle du jeu (1939).

She had a liaison with actor Jean Marais from 1942 to 1944, remaining lifelong friends, and in 1976 she was his business associate in a pottery shop. Marais was the long-term lover of Jean Cocteau and her co-star in the latter's 1946 film version of Beauty and the Beast.

She gave up acting in the late 1950s in order to take care of her racing car driving husband Taso Mathieson, who had been injured in an accident.

She also worked with such notable directors as Max Ophüls, Jean Renoir, Robert Bresson, Fritz Lang and G.W. Pabst. She returned to acting briefly in the late 1980s.

Mila Parély died on 14 January 2012, aged 94, in Vichy, where she had spent the last fifty years of her life.

Selected filmography
 Compliments of Mister Flow (1936)
 Royal Waltz (1936)
 The Brighton Twins (1936)
 The Shanghai Drama (1938)
 The Rules of the Game (1939)
 The White Slave (1939)
 The Phantom Carriage (1939)
 Extenuating Circumstances (1939)
 They Were Twelve Women (1940)
 Le Lit à colonnes (1942)
 The White Truck (1943)
 Father Serge (1945)
 The Black Cavalier (1945)
 Beauty and the Beast (1946)
 Women's Games (1946)
 Star Without Light (1946)
 Last Refuge (1947)
 Snowbound (1948)
 Mission in Tangier (1949)
 Le Plaisir (1952)
 Blood Orange (1953)

References

External links

1917 births
2012 deaths
Actresses from Paris
Polish emigrants to France
20th-century French actresses
French film actresses